The Perla-class submarines were the third sub-class of the 600 Series of coastal submarines built for the Royal Italian Navy (Regia Marina) during the 1930s and named after gemstones. Of the ten boats built of this class, only three survived World War II.

Design and description
The Perla-class submarines were essentially repeats of the preceding . The modifications that were made compared to the boats of the previous series were mostly of upgrade nature. Among them were enlargement of the false tower at the top, more modern engines, installation of a radiogoniometer that could be controlled from inside the ship. Improvements and the installation of new air conditioning equipment meant a slight increase in displacement, and increase in the fuel stowage also increased the autonomy of these boats compared to the previous series. Their designed full load displacement was  surfaced and  submerged, but varied somewhat depending on the boat and the builder.

When submerged each propeller was driven by a  electric motor. They could reach  on the surface and  underwater.

The boats were armed with six internal  torpedo tubes, four in the bow and two in the stern. One reload torpedo was carried for each tube, for a total of twelve. They were also armed with one  deck gun for combat on the surface. The light anti-aircraft armament consisted of one or two pairs of   machine guns.

Ships

Service

The boats, once commissioned, were assigned to complete the squadrons of "600" submarines from La Spezia (12th and 13th Squadrons) and Messina (34th and 35th Squadrons) and began their training and exercises in metropolitan waters, and underwent endurance training predominantly in the Dodecanese and, to a lesser extent, along the coast of North Africa. These endurance exercises took place in 1936 and 1937, soon after the initial training was finished.

They retained their Italian crews but had a Spanish liaison officer on board. They were returned to the Italian Navy at the end of the conflict.

At the outbreak of hostilities, four boats were located at La Spezia, three in Cagliari, two in Augusta and one, in Massawa.

After a disastrous start to the World War II when Italy lost ten submarines in the first twenty days, and the Regia Marina and Regia Aeronautica did not fare much better, Italian command decided to speed up implementation of experimental SLC technology. In July 1940  was modified to carry 4 "Maiale" manned torpedoes in watertight containers on the deck of the submarines.  was sunk while conducting tests, before she could be employed against British naval units.  underwent conversion to SLC in March 1942 with three SLC units being fitted onto her deck. In December 1942,
 managed to penetrate Algiers harbor, and sank or seriously damaged several merchant ships with a total GRT over 20,000.

In common with other Italian submarines the survivors were fitted with smaller conning towers in 1942–43.

Overall, the Perla class submarines proved to be quite successful. They showed good maneuverability, their hull was well designed and strongly built to withstand depth pressure and explosions that exceeded their test values.

See also
 Italian submarines of World War II

Notes

References

External links
 Sommergibili Marina Militare website

  

Italian 600 Series submarines
 
Perla
Military units and formations of the Spanish Civil War